Francisco Bahamonde de Lugo was Governor of Puerto Rico (1564–1568) and Governor of Cartagena de Indias (1572–1574). He died in office in Cartagena.

Governor of Puerto Rico
The population of San Germán, located then in Guayanilla, asked him for permission to move the villa to its present location due to the attacks of French privateers (1565) and Caribbean Indians (1568).
In 1567, Bahamonde complained to the king of Spain about illegal immigration to Puerto Rico and the king advised him on what he could do.

In 1568, the governor Francisco Bahamonde de Lugo saw the necessity to ask for the services of a Spanish doctor. The doctor chosen was Hernando de Cataño, who when accepting the position, received like payments in a lot and several parcels of land (in Spanish, "caballería", an archaic measure of area equivalent to 100 by 200 feet, or 1,858 m2) located across the harbor from the islet of San Juan. Thus the place was named after its owner.

Family
Francisco Bahamonde de Lugo was born in the Canary Islands into the noble family that conquered the islands for the Crown of Castile. He was a descendant of Inés de Lugo, sister of Alonso Fernández de Lugo, first Adelantado of the Canary Islands.

References

Governors of Puerto Rico
Spanish conquistadors
Canarian conquistadors
16th-century Spanish people
16th century in Puerto Rico

Puerto Rican people of Canarian descent
Governors of Cartagena, Colombia
1574 deaths
Year of birth missing
People from Tenerife